Esmeralda is  a feminine given name of Portuguese and Spanish origin meaning emerald. The name was used for a Roma character in The Hunchback of Notre Dame, an 1831 novel by Victor Hugo that has been dramatized on film and screen and also brought the name to the attention of people in the English-speaking world. Esméralda is a French version of the name.

Popularity 
The name has consistently ranked among the top 100 names for girls in Mexico over the last century and is also well-used for girls in Spain. The name has ranked among the top 1,000 names for girls in the United States, a country with a sizable population of Spanish speakers, since 1951 and among the top 500 names since 1973. The name was at its most popular for American girls in the late 1990s and early 2000s, when it was ranked among the top 200 names for girls. Its popularity coincided with the release of the 1996 Disney film The Hunchback of Notre Dame.

People with the given name
 Princess Marie-Esméralda of Belgium (Esméralda de Réthy, born 1956), Belgian royalty
 Esmeralda Devlin (born 1971), British stage and costume designer
 Esmeralda de Jesus Garcia (born 1959), Brazilian track and field athlete
 Esmeralda Negron (born 1983) Puerto Rican coach and retired footballer
 Esmeralda Pimentel (born 1989), Mexican actress
 Esmeralda Rego de Jesus Araujo, known as Sister Esmeralda, East Timorese nun and resistance activist 
 Esmeralda Santiago (born 1948), Puerto Rican author and actress
 Esmeralda Yaniche (born 1991), Venezuelan model and pageant titleholder

See also 
 Esmé, given name sometimes used as a nickname for Esmeralda

References  

Given names derived from gemstones
Spanish feminine given names
Portuguese feminine given names